The 2022 Texas Longhorns football team represented the University of Texas at Austin as a member of the Big 12 Conference during the 2022 NCAA Division I FBS football season. Led by second-year head coach Steve Sarkisian, the Longhorns played their home games at Darrell K Royal–Texas Memorial Stadium in Austin, Texas.

Previous season
The Longhorns finished the 2021 season with a 5–7 record, 3–6 in Big 12 play.

Offseason

Departures

Over the course of the off-season, Texas lost 46 total players. 23 players graduated, while the other 24 entered the transfer portal. Of the 47 lost, 16 were starters for multiple games last season including starting quarterback Casey Thompson.

Team departures

Outgoing transfers

Note: Players with a dash in the new school column didn't land on a new team for the 2022 season.

Coaching staff departures
During the off-season, Texas lost 2 position coaches and 3 support staff members. The two position coaches that departed the team were running backs coach Stan Drayton and wide receivers coach Andre Coleman. Drayton took an upgrade by becoming the 32nd head coach at Temple, while Coleman was relieved of his duties at Texas. Furthermore, Drayton and Coleman were the final 2 coaches that were under both previous head coach Tom Herman and current head coach Steve Sarkisian.

Note: Andre Coleman didn't find a new coaching job at the collegiate level for the 2022 season.

Acquisitions

Incoming transfers

Over the off-season, Texas added 7 players from the transfer portal. According to 247 Sports, Texas had the 8th ranked transfer class in the country. The first transfer was quarterback Quinn Ewers. Ewers transferred from Ohio State and was the highest ranked recruit since former Longhorn quarterback Vince Young. On the offensive side, Texas also added Alabama tight end Jahleel Billingsley, Alabama wide receiver Agiye Hall, Wyoming wide receiver Isaiah Neyor, and Iowa State wide receiver Tarique Milton. However, Texas only took 2 defensive transfers in Ohio State defensive back Ryan Watts and JMU linebacker Diamonte Tucker-Dorsey.

2022 recruits

2022 overall class ranking

2023 recruits

2023 overall class ranking

Walk-ons

Coaching staff additions

NFL undrafted free agents

No Longhorns were selected in the 2022 NFL Draft, a first since 2014. However, 6 players were signed as undrafted free agents.

NFL Draft Combine

† Top performer

DNP = Did not participate

Returning starters

Texas returns 7 starters on offense, 12 starters on defense, and 1 starter on special teams. 3 of the 7 offensive starters are seniors, 9 of the 12 defensive starters are seniors, and the lone special teams player is a senior. 

Offense

Defense

Special teams

Preseason

The preseason poll was released on July 7, 2022.

Award watch lists
Listed in the order that they were released

Preseason Big-12 awards

2022 Preseason All-Big 12 teams

Source:

Preseason All-Americans

Personnel

Coaching staff
Source:

Support staff
 Jason grooms – Chief of Staff
 Matt smidebush – Director of Operations
 Jason rodriquez – Assistant Operations Coordinator
 Billy glasscock – Director of Player Personnel
 Chris gilbert – Director of High School Relations
 Brandon Harris – Director of Recruiting
 John michael jones – Assistant Director, Player Personnel, Offense
 Robert merritt – Assistant Director, Player Personnel, Scouting
 Austin shelton – Assistant Director, Player Personnel, Defense
 Taylor searels – Director of Recruiting Operations
 Tyler Johnson — Coordinator of Recruiting Operations
 Kevin washington – Director of Player Development
 Michael Huff – Assistant Director of Player Development
 Matt Rutherford — Director, Equipment Operations
 Trevor Cook — Assistant Equipment Manager
 Joshua Peterson — Assistant Equipment Manager
 Derek Ochoa — Director of Football Creative Media
 Kyle Barkle — Assistant Director of Creative Media
 Patrick Perala — Senior Graphic Designer
 Michael Good — Content Creator
 James Bray — Head Team Physician
 Donald Nguyen — Senior Associate Athletic Trainer, Head Athletic Trainer
 Daryl Faulkner — Associate Athletic Trainer
 Johnathan Tran — Assistant Athletic Trainer
 Stephen Galvan — Assistant Athletic Trainer
 Cory Castro — Assistant Coach, Athletic Performance
 Isaiah Gonzales — Assistant Coach, Athletic Performance
 Markus James — Assistant Coach, Athletic Performance
 Joe Vaughn — Assistant Coach, Athletic Performance
 Jeff Nelson — Director of Football Academic Services
 Amy Culp — Assistant Athletic Director, Sports Dietitian and Clinical Wellness 
 Kirsten Gregurich — Assistant Sports Dietitian
 DJ Welte — Director, Football Video Operations
 Bob Napoles — Senior Video Coordinator
 Desmond Dildy — Video Coordinator
 Esmee Smiley — Video Coordinator
 Kyrah mccowan – Director, Football Administration and Program Relations
 Amy Biegel — Assistant Program Administrator

Analysts
 Gary Patterson – Special Assistant to the Head Coach
 David Brock — Senior Analyst, Offense
 Greg McMahon — Analyst, Special Teams
 Jeff crosby – Senior Analyst, Special Teams
 Henry fernandez – Senior Analyst, Defense
 Joey thomas – Senior Analyst, Defense
 John dozier dean – Analyst, Offense
 Michael bimonte – Analyst, Offense
 Ray pickering – Analyst, Offense

Graduate assistants
 Tyler Fambrough — Offense
 Mitch Zoloty — Offense
 Tevis Bartlett — Defense
 Nico Johnson — Defense

Roster
Source:

Roster outlook
(*)Redshirt

Schedule

Texas and the Big 12 announced the 2022 football schedule on December 1, 2021. Texas will play 7 home games, 4 away games, and 1 neutral site game. The 7 home games will be played against Louisiana-Monroe, Alabama, UTSA, West Virginia, Iowa State, TCU, and Baylor. The 4 away games will be played against Texas Tech, Oklahoma State, Kansas State, and Kansas. The 1 neutral site game will be played against Oklahoma at the Cotton Bowl in Dallas, Texas in the annual Red River Showdown.

Game summaries

vs. Louisiana–Monroe

Sources:Stats

vs. No. 1 Alabama

Sources:Stats

ESPN College GameDay announced that they were returning to Austin for the 8th time, and the first time since 2019. They were set up at the LBJ Lawn.

Fox brought their Big Noon Kickoff pregame show to Austin for the first time, it was set up at the Winship Circle as part of the "Hook 'Em Hangout".

vs. UTSA

Sources:Stats

at Texas Tech

Sources:Stats

vs. West Virginia

Sources:Stats

vs. Oklahoma

Sources:Stats

Largest margin of victory versus Oklahoma.
Oklahoma was shutout for the first time since November 7, 1998 versus Texas A&M.
Texas shutout Oklahoma for the first time since October 9, 1965.
Most points scored (49) versus Oklahoma all-time, surpassing the 48 scored October 6, 2018.

vs. Iowa State

Sources:Stats

at No. 11 Oklahoma State

Sources:Stats

at No. 13 Kansas State

Sources:Stats

vs. No. 4 TCU

Sources: Stats

ESPN College GameDay returned to Austin for the 2nd time of the season, and 9th time overall.

at Kansas

Sources:Stats

vs. Baylor

Sources: Stats

vs. No. 12 Washington (Alamo Bowl)

Sources:Stats

Statistics

Team statistics

Individual statistics

Offense

Defense

Key: POS: Position, SOLO: Solo Tackles, AST: Assisted Tackles, TOT: Total Tackles, TFL: Tackles-for-loss, SACK: Quarterback Sacks, INT: Interceptions, BU: Passes Broken Up, PD: Passes Defended, QBH: Quarterback Hits, FR: Fumbles Recovered, FF: Forced Fumbles, BLK: Kicks or Punts Blocked, SAF: Safeties, TD : Touchdown

Special teams

Awards and honors

National awards and honors

Conference honors

All-Americans

All Star games

TV ratings

All totals via Sports Media Watch. Streaming numbers not included. † - Data not available.

Rankings

References

Texas
Texas Longhorns football seasons
Texas Longhorns football